Constance "Connie" Morrison was an American politician.

Morrison lived with her husband and family in Burnsville, Minnesota and was involved with the real estate business. Morris served on the Burnsville City Council from 1977 to 1983 and as mayor of Burnsville from 1983 to 1986. She then served in the Minnesota House of Representatives from 1987 to 1994 and was a Republican.

References

Year of birth unknown
Living people
People from Burnsville, Minnesota
Businesspeople from Minnesota
Women state legislators in Minnesota
Women mayors of places in Minnesota
Women city councillors in Minnesota
Republican Party members of the Minnesota House of Representatives
Year of birth missing (living people)